Roark may refer to:
Roark Capital Group, a US-based private equity firm
 USS Roark (FF-1053), a United States Navy frigate
 Roark, Missouri

People with the name
 Roark Bradford (1896–1948), American short story writer and novelist
 Roark Critchlow (born 1963), Canadian actor
 Roark Gourley (born 1949), American painter, sculptor, and mixed media artist
 Charles Thomas Irvine Roark, British polo player
 James Roark (1946?–1995), pseudonym of photographer James Barnas
 Raymond Jefferson Roark (1890–1966), Professor of Mechanics (University of Wisconsin), known for writing Roark's Formulas for Stress and Strain, later co-authored with Warren C. Young (1923–2012)
 William Marshall Roark (1938–1965), United States fighter pilot killed over North Vietnam
 Tanner Roark (born 1986), American baseball pitcher

Fictional
 Howard Roark, the protagonist of Ayn Rand's The Fountainhead
 Roark family, a fictional dynasty in Frank Miller's graphic novel series Sin City
 Roark Junior, the primary villain of That Yellow Bastard
 Ted Roark, a character on Chuck
 Roark (Pokémon), the Gym Leader of the Oreburgh Gym in Pokémon Diamond and Pearl